Sidney Postol (1918 – April 28, 2014) was an American businessman and politician.

Born in Bridgeport, Connecticut, Postol served in the United States Army during World War II in Europe. Postol received his bachelor's degree from Yale College, went to Harvard Law School, Harvard Graduate School, and the Yale Labor and Management Center. He worked in the lumber business and in transportation. Postol served in local government including town government and board of education in Fairfield, Connecticut. In 1987, Postol served in the Connecticut House of Representatives as a Democrat. He died in Fairfield, Connecticut.

Notes

1918 births
2014 deaths
Politicians from Bridgeport, Connecticut
People from Fairfield, Connecticut
Yale College alumni
Harvard Law School alumni
Businesspeople from Bridgeport, Connecticut
Democratic Party members of the Connecticut House of Representatives
20th-century American businesspeople
United States Army personnel of World War II